The Con is an American true crime television series that premiered on ABC on October 14, 2020.

Produced by ABC News and narrated by Whoopi Goldberg, the series explores stories of people taken in by claims and promises that proved too good to be true, revealing how the victims were fooled and the cost of their false trust. The series also features interviews with the people caught up in the cons, victims, eyewitnesses, law enforcement and the perpetrators themselves.

On July 25, 2022, the series was renewed for a second season which premiered on July 28, 2022.

Episodes

Series overview

Season 1 (2020–21)

Season 2 (2022)

Reception

U.S. ratings

Season 1

Season 2

See also
 Bob Nygaard, private detective featured in episode 6, "The Psychic Con".
 Mark Edward, mentalist featured in episode 6, "The Psychic Con", as "The Expert".

References

External links
 
 

True crime television series
2020s American documentary television series
English-language television shows
American Broadcasting Company original programming
2020 American television series debuts
ABC News